Madhuca utilis is a tree in the family Sapotaceae. The specific epithet utilis means "useful", referring to the timber.

Description
The bark is greyish brown.

Distribution and habitat
Madhuca utilis is native to Peninsular Malaysia and Borneo.

Conservation
Madhuca utilis has been assessed as endangered on the IUCN Red List. The species is threatened by logging and conversion of land for palm oil plantations.

References

utilis
Trees of Peninsular Malaysia
Trees of Borneo
Plants described in 1918